Call of the Prairie is a 1936 American Western film directed by Howard Bretherton and written by Doris Schroeder and Vernon Smith. The film stars William Boyd, James Ellison, Muriel Evans, George "Gabby" Hayes, Chester Conklin, Al Bridge and Willie Fung. The film was released on March 6, 1936, by Paramount Pictures.

Plot

Cast  
 William Boyd as Hopalong Cassidy
 James Ellison as Johnny Nelson 
 Muriel Evans as Linda McHenry
 George "Gabby" Hayes as Charlie Shanghai McHenry 
 Chester Conklin as Sheriff Sandy McQueen
 Al Bridge as Sam Porter
 Willie Fung as Wong
 Howard Lang as Buck Peters
 Hank Mann as Bartender Tom
 Al Hill as Henchman Tom Slade
 James Mason as Henchman Hoskins
 John Merton as Henchman Arizona
 Chill Wills as Singing Cowhand
 Art Green as Singing Cowhand 
 Walter Trask as Singing Cowhand 
 Don Brookins as Singing Cowhand

References

External links 
 
 
 
 

1936 films
American Western (genre) films
1936 Western (genre) films
Paramount Pictures films
Films directed by Howard Bretherton
Hopalong Cassidy films
American black-and-white films
1930s English-language films
1930s American films